Hywel Rhodri Morgan (29 September 1939 – 17 May 2017) was a Welsh Labour politician who was the First Minister of Wales and the Leader of Welsh Labour from 2000 to 2009. He was also the Assembly Member for Cardiff West from 1999 to 2011 and the Member of Parliament for Cardiff West from 1987 to 2001. He was, the longest-serving First Minister of Wales. He was Chancellor of Swansea University from 2011 to 2017.

Early life and education
Born in Cardiff, Hywel Rhodri Morgan was the son of Professor T. J. Morgan and the brother of historian Prys Morgan. His second cousin is Professor Garel Rhys.

Morgan was educated at Whitchurch Grammar School (which merged with Whitchurch County Secondary School to become the comprehensive Whitchurch High School in 1968) in Whitchurch, Cardiff; St John's College, Oxford, graduating with a degree in PPE in 1961; and Harvard University, where he gained an MA in Government in 1963.

Career

Early career
Before entering politics, Morgan worked as a research officer in local and central government from 1965 to 1971, an economic adviser to the Department of Trade and Industry from 1972 to 1974 and an Industrial Development Officer for South Glamorgan County Council from 1974 to 1980. He then served as Head of the European Community's office in Wales from 1980 to 1987. He was also a tutor for the Workers' Educational Association between 1963 and 1965.

Westminster
Morgan was elected as Member of Parliament (MP) for Cardiff West in 1987. From 1988 to 1994, he was a Shadow Environment Spokesman. He was also Chairman of the House of Commons Select Committee on Public Administration (1997–1999), and Opposition Front Bench Spokesman on Energy (1988–92) and Welsh Affairs (1992–1997). He stepped down from the House of Commons at the 2001 General Election. As an MP, Morgan was aligned with the soft left of the Labour Party.

National Assembly for Wales

First Assembly (1999)
A committed supporter of Welsh devolution, Morgan contested the position of Labour's nominee for the (then titled) First Secretary for Wales. He lost to the then Secretary of State for Wales, Ron Davies. Davies was then forced to resign his position after an alleged sex scandal, whereupon Morgan again ran for the post. His opponent, Alun Michael, the new Secretary of State for Wales, was seen as a reluctant participant despite also having a long-standing commitment to Welsh devolution, and was widely regarded as being the choice of the UK leadership of the Labour Party.

Michael was duly elected to the leadership but resigned a little more than a year later, amid threats of an imminent no-confidence vote and alleged plotting against him by members of not only his own party, but also Assembly groups and Cabinet members. Morgan, who had served as Minister for Economic Development under Michael, became Labour's new nominee for First Secretary, and was elected in February 2000, later becoming First Minister on 16 October 2000 when the position was retitled. He was also appointed to the Privy Council in July 2000.

Morgan stepped down from the House of Commons at the 2001 General Election.

Morgan's leadership was characterised by a willingness to distance himself from a number of aspects of UK Labour Party policy, particularly in relation to plans to introduce choice and competition into public services, which he has argued do not fit Welsh attitudes and values, and would not work effectively in a smaller and more rural country. In a speech given in Swansea to the National Centre for Public Policy in November 2002, Morgan stated his opposition to foundation hospitals (a UK Labour proposal), and referred to the "Clear Red Water" separating policies in Wales and in Westminster.

Second Assembly (2003)

On 1 May 2003, Labour under Morgan's leadership was re-elected in the Assembly elections. Morgan managed to win enough seats to form a Labour-only administration (the election was held under proportional representation, and Labour won 30 of the 60 seats in the Assembly and the overall majority was achieved when Dafydd Elis-Thomas AM was elected Presiding Officer of the Assembly) and named his cabinet on 9 May. In that election, Labour easily took back all of the former strongholds they lost to Plaid Cymru at the height of Alun Michael's unpopularity in 1999.

In his second term, Morgan's administration continued its theme of "Welsh solutions for Welsh problems", a marked contrast to the Blairite public service reform agenda. Instead of competition, Welsh Labour emphasised the need for collaboration between public service providers.

Third Assembly (2007)
Labour was the biggest party with 26 out of the 60 seats, five short of an overall majority. After one month of minority government, Morgan signed a coalition agreement (One Wales) with Ieuan Wyn Jones, leader of Plaid Cymru, on 27 June 2007. Morgan became the first modern political leader of Wales to lead an Assembly with powers to pass primary legislation (subject to consent from Westminster).

Retirement
In July 2005, Morgan announced his intention to lead the Welsh Labour party into the 2007 general election, but retire as leader and First Minister sometime in 2009, when he would be 70. On his 70th birthday (29 September) he set the exact date as immediately following the Assembly's budget session on 8 December 2009. Counsel General Carwyn Jones, Health Minister Edwina Hart and Merthyr Tydfil and Rhymney AM Huw Lewis entered a leadership contest to elect a new Labour leader in Wales. On 1 December 2009 the winner was declared as Carwyn Jones, who assumed office as First Minister on 10 December 2009. Morgan remained a backbench AM until April 2011, when the third Assembly was dissolved prior to the general election on 5 May 2011.

Personal life 
In 1967, he married Julie Morgan (née Edwards), who was later the Labour MP for Cardiff North between 1997 and 2010. The couple lived in Michaelston-le-Pit (a village situated outside their constituencies), and were patrons of the British Humanist Association. They had a son and two daughters.

In July 2007, Morgan was admitted to hospital where he underwent heart surgery. Even though he left hospital within the week, doctors said he would not be fully recovered for a few weeks.

Death

Morgan collapsed on the evening of 17 May 2017 while cycling on  Road, Wenvoe, near his home. Police and paramedics were called to the scene and he was pronounced dead. He was 77.

Morgan's family held a humanist funeral for him, in line with his humanist beliefs, at the Welsh Assembly on 31 May, which was open on a first-come first-served basis to the public, as well as broadcast on screens outside the Senedd and online. The funeral was televised and billed as a major national event. The ceremony was led by Morgan's friend and former Welsh Labour colleague Lorraine Barrett. A private service of committal was held at Thornhill Crematorium's Wenallt Chapel in Cardiff the next day.

Honorary degrees

Morgan was awarded several honorary degrees for his service to the United Kingdom, including the following.

He was also appointed Chancellor of Swansea University in 2011, a post he held until his death. He had close links with the university as both his parents had graduated from it in the 1920s and his father and brother also taught there.

References

External links

 

1939 births
2017 deaths
Alumni of St John's College, Oxford
Cool Cymru
Cycling road incident deaths
Fellows of St John's College, Oxford
First Ministers of Wales
Harvard University alumni
Leaders of political parties in Wales
Members of the Parliament of the United Kingdom for Cardiff constituencies
Members of the Privy Council of the United Kingdom
Members of the Welsh Assembly Government
People associated with Swansea University
People educated at Whitchurch Grammar School, Cardiff
Politicians from Cardiff
Transport and General Workers' Union-sponsored MPs
UK MPs 1987–1992
UK MPs 1992–1997
UK MPs 1997–2001
Wales AMs 1999–2003
Wales AMs 2003–2007
Wales AMs 2007–2011
Welsh humanists
Welsh Labour members of the Senedd
Welsh Labour Party MPs
Welsh socialists
Welsh-speaking politicians